The arrow loach (Nemacheilus masyai)  is a species of ray-finned fish in the genus Nemacheilus.

Information
Nemacheilus masyai or the "arrow loach", can be found in a freshwater environment within a benthopelagic depth habitat. They are native to a tropical climate. The average length of the Nemacheilus masya as an unsexed male is about 13.5 centimeters or about 5.3 inches. The body of this species is a light colour with dark splotches that can be found on its side. It can be identified by its elongated slim body. The arrow loach is known to be found in the areas of Asia, western Malaysia, Peninsular Thailand, the Meklong, part of the Mae Nam Chao Phraya basins, and the Mekong Basin. It is known to occur in shallow forest rivers and steams. They prefer a slow current of clear to slightly turbid water, with a muddy or sandy bottom.  As far as their diet goes, this species feeds on insects, larvae, and invertebrate that live in the water. The females of this species are somewhat larger and of a bigger stature than the males are.

The specific name honours Thai science illustrator Luang Masya Chitrakarn, fisheries scholar, one of the pioneers of fisheries in Thailand.

Aquarium
The Nemacheilus masyai has the ability to be an aquarium fish and is used for commercial use. It is considered to be an easily maintained fish.  A tank size that is about 30 by 60 centimeters is the minimum size that is recommended for this species. The temperature should be about 23 - 26 degrees Celsius, or 68 to 72 degrees Fahrenheit.  The diet of the Nemacheilus masyai consists of frozen food like Daphnia, Artemia, and bloodworm that will result in the best colouration and condition.

References

Footnotes 
 

M
Fish described in 1933
Taxobox binomials not recognized by IUCN